Apollonius is a masculine given name which may refer to:

People

Ancient world

Artists 
 Apollonius of Athens (sculptor) (fl. 1st century BC)
 Apollonius of Tralles (fl. 2nd century BC), sculptor
 Apollonius (satyr sculptor)
 Apollonius (son of Archias), sculptor

Historians 
 Apollonius of Aphrodisias (fl. c. 3rd century BC), historian of Caria
 Apollonius of Ascalon, historian mentioned by Stephanus of Byzantium

Writers 
 Apollonius Attaleus, writer on dreams
 Apollonius of Acharnae, ancient Greek writer on festivals
 Apollonius of Laodicea, writer on astrology
 Apollonius of Rhodes (born c. 270 BC), librarian and poet, best known for the Argonautica
 Apollonius (son of Chaeris), ancient Greek writer, mentioned by the scholiast on Aristophanes
 Apollonius (son of Sotades), writer

Oratory 
 Apollonius Dyscolus (fl. 2nd century AD), grammarian
 Apollonius Eidographus, ancient Greek grammarian
 Apollonius Molon (fl. 70 BC), rhetorician
 Apollonius of Athens or Apollonius of Naucratis, (fl. 2nd century AD), sophist and rhetorician
 Apollonius the Effeminate (fl. 120 BC), Greek rhetorician of Alabanda in Caria
 Apollonius the Sophist, grammarian who lived towards the end of the 1st century, and wrote a renowned Homeric lexicon

Philosophers 
 Apollonius Cronus (fl. 4th century BC), philosopher of the Megarian school
 Apollonius of Chalcedon, philosophy tutor to the emperors Marcus Aurelius and Lucius Verus
 Apollonius of Syria, Platonic philosopher
 Apollonius of Tyana (c. 40–c. 100 AD), Neo-Pythagorean philosopher
 Apollonius of Tyre (philosopher), Stoic philosopher
 Apollonius paradoxographus (fl. 2nd century BC), paradoxographer

Political 
 Apollonius (ambassador) (fl. 2nd century BC), ambassador sent from the Seleucid Empire
 Apollonius (consul 460), consul in 460
 Apollonius (freedman), or Publius Licinius Apollonius, secretary of Publius Licinius Crassus
 Apollonius (magister militum) (fl. 443–451), Eastern Roman general
 Apollonius of Clazomenae (fl. 2nd century BC), ambassador sent to the Seleucid Empire
 Apollonius of Drepanum (fl. 2nd century BC), citizen of Sicily
 Apollonius of Sicily, leader of a revolt in 103 BCE
 Apollonius (praetorian prefect) (442–443), Roman Praetorian prefect
 Apollonius (Seleucid) (fl. 2nd century BC) a friend of Demetrius I Soter
 Apollonius (son of Charinus), politician under Alexander the Great
 Apollonius the dioiketes (fl. 250 BC), finance minister of Egypt
 Apollonius (tyrant), (fl. 1st century BC), Mesopotamian tyrant
 Apollonius, general of the Samarians, who was defeated at the Battle of Ma'aleh Levona in 167 BC

Religious figures 
 Apollonius (bishop of Ephesus), 2nd-century Christian writer
 Apollonius (martyr), Christian martyr of the 2nd century
 Apollonius of Egypt, theorist on the age of the world
 Apollonius of Ephesus (fl. 180–210), religious leader and writer
 Apollonius the Apologist (died c. 186), religious leader
 Apollonius of Rome, Christian martyr of the 4th century

Physicians and scientists 
 List of physicians named Apollonius, a list of physicians in ancient Greece and Rome
 Apollonius Glaucus, physician
 Apollonius of Citium (fl. 1st century BC), physician
 Apollonius of Perga (late 3rd–early 2nd centuries BC), geometer and astronomer

Other 
 Apollonius of Myndus, ancient astrologer said to be skilled with horoscopes

Modern world 
 Apollonius Schotte (c. 1579–1639), Dutch statesman
 Apollonius von Maltitz (1795–1870), Russian diplomat

Fictional characters 
 Apollonius of Tyre, medieval fictional character

See also 
 Apollinaris (disambiguation)
 Apollo (disambiguation) 
 Apollodorus (disambiguation)
 Apollonia (disambiguation) 
 Apollonius point, a triangle center in plane geometry
 Apollonius' theorem, an elementary geometry theorem about triangles
 Circles of Apollonius
 Problem of Apollonius, geometric problem touching on tangency of circle
 Parnassius apollonius, scientific name of a butterfly

Masculine given names